My Brahim is a town in Al Haouz Province, Marrakesh-Safi, Morocco. According to the 2004 census it has a population of 3,273.

References

Populated places in Al Haouz Province